Arzos (Turkish: Kulakli) is a village in the northern part of the Evros regional unit in Greece. It is situated on the left bank of the river Ardas, about 20 km northwest of Orestiada.  Arzos is part of the municipal unit of Trigono. In 2011 its population was 237 for the village and 433 for the municipal district, which includes the village Kanadas.

Population

History
A tomb found near Arzos dates back to the 4th century BC. Arzos was ruled by the Ottoman Empire until the Balkan Wars of 1913. After a brief period of Bulgarian rule between 1913 and 1919, it became part of Greece. As a result its Bulgarian and Turkish population was exchanged with Greek refugees, mainly from today's Turkey.

See also

List of settlements in the Evros regional unit

External links
Arzos on GTP Travel Pages

References

Populated places in Evros (regional unit)